Big Soul is the debut album of American garage punk band The Original Sins, released in 1987 through Bar/None Records on vinyl format. The record was reissued in 1994 on CD format, which included bonus tracks, an alternative track listing, and different artwork.

Track listing
All songs written by John Terlesky

Personnel

The Original Sins
Ken Bussiere – bass guitar, backing vocals
Dave Ferrara – drums, backing vocals
Dan McKinney – keyboards
John Terlesky – vocals, guitar, mixing

Additional musicians and production
Lee Dick – assistant engineering
E.V.I. – design
James MacMillan – engineering, mixing
Glenn Morrow – production, mixing
Bico Stupakoff – photography

References

External links
 

1987 debut albums
The Original Sins albums